Tiril Bue (born 26 April 1993) is a Norwegian competitive sailor.

She qualified for competing in the Laser Radial class at the 2016 Summer Olympics in Rio de Janeiro.

References

1993 births
Living people
Norwegian female sailors (sport)
Sailors at the 2016 Summer Olympics – Laser Radial
Olympic sailors of Norway